The canton of Paray-le-Monial is an administrative division of the Saône-et-Loire department, eastern France. Its borders were modified at the French canton reorganisation which came into effect in March 2015. Its seat is in Paray-le-Monial.

It consists of the following communes:
 
Anzy-le-Duc
Artaix
Baugy
Bourg-le-Comte
Céron
Chambilly
Chenay-le-Châtel
Hautefond
L'Hôpital-le-Mercier
Marcigny
Melay
Montceaux-l'Étoile
Nochize
Paray-le-Monial
Poisson
Saint-Léger-lès-Paray
Saint-Martin-du-Lac
Saint-Yan
Versaugues
Vindecy
Vitry-en-Charollais
Volesvres

References

Cantons of Saône-et-Loire